The Meiringen–Reichenbach–Aareschlucht tramway (MRA) was a metre gauge electric tramway in the Swiss canton of Bern. It linked the town of Meiringen with the tourist attractions of the Reichenbach Falls, where it served the lower station of the Reichenbachfall Funicular, and the Aare Gorge, where it served the gorge's western entrance.

The tramway was opened in 1912, and closed in 1956, being replaced by a bus service. The line was electrified at 500 V DC. After 1926, the tramway crossed the Meiringen–Innertkirchen railway by a level crossing at Alpbach; whilst both lines were of the same gauge there was no other connection between the lines.

The only visible remains of line is the tram depot, in the centre of Meiringen and now used by the municipality, and the abutments of the bridge used to cross the Aare river.

References

Bibliography 
 

Tram transport in Switzerland
Transport in the canton of Bern
Metre gauge railways in Switzerland
Defunct town tramway systems by city
Railway companies established in 1912
Railway companies disestablished in 1956